Ina Claire (born Ina Fagan; October 15, 1893February 21, 1985) was an American stage and film actress.

Early years
Ina Fagan was born October 15, 1893 in Washington, D.C. After the death of her father, Claire began doing imitations of fellow boarders in the boarding house where she and her mother, Cora, and brother, Allen, were forced to live. Claire's mother took her out of school in the eighth grade, and she used her mother's maiden name when she began her career appearing in vaudeville. In 1906, she gave a recitation as the grand finale of a program presented by Miss Cora B. Shreve's pupils in Washington, D.C. She was identified in a newspaper article as Ina Claire Fagan.

Career 
Claire made her professional stage debut in October 1907 in Elmira, New York. She played Florie in a production of The Fatal Flower — the beginning of a two-year contract.

In 1909, she appeared in a vaudeville act entitled "Dainty Mimic", which included an imitation of actor Harry Lauder. A booking agent described this act as "one of the best single Acts" he had seen that season and remarked that "She possesses a great deal of magnatism [sic] and is a big hit."

She performed on Broadway in the musicals Jumping Jupiter and The Quaker Girl (both 1911) and Lady Luxury, and starred on Broadway in plays by some of the leading comic dramatists of the 1920s, 1930s, and 1940s, including the roles of Jerry Lamarr in Avery Hopwood's The Gold Diggers (1919), Mrs. Cheyney in Frederick Lonsdale's The Last of Mrs. Cheyney (1925), Lady George Grayston in W. Somerset Maugham's Our Betters (1928), and Enid Fuller in George Kelly's Fatal Weakness. Between 1929 and 1931, she was married to screen actor John Gilbert, who was her second husband.

Claire later became identified with the high comedies of S. N. Behrman, and created the female leads in three of his plays: Biography (1934), End of Summer (1936), and The Talley Method (1941). Behrman wrote of Claire's performance in one of his comedies: "Her readings were translucent, her stage presence encompassing. The flick of an intonation deflated pomposity. She never missed a nuance." Critic J. Brooks Atkinson praised Claire for her, "refulgent comic intelligence".

Claire was retired from the stage for five years in the early 1940s, living with her husband in San Francisco. She returned to perform in the comedy The Fatal Weakness. Her last stage appearance was as Lady Elizabeth Mulhammer in T. S. Eliot's The Confidential Clerk (1954).

She made her film debut in Cecil B. DeMille's The Wild Goose Chase (1915). She is best remembered today for her role as the Grand Duchess Swana in the romantic comedy Ninotchka (1939), directed by Ernst Lubitsch and starring Greta Garbo.

Death
Ina Claire died on February 21, 1985, in San Francisco, California, following a heart attack. She was 91 years old. She is buried in Mount Olivet Cemetery located in Salt Lake City. She was an inductee in the American Theater Hall of Fame and has a star on the Hollywood Walk of Fame.

Filmography

References

External links

 
 
 
 
 
 Ina Claire at Silent Ladies & Gents
 Ina Claire at Virtual History

1893 births
1985 deaths
20th-century American actresses
Actresses from San Francisco
Actresses from Washington, D.C.
American film actresses
American stage actresses
American silent film actresses